In 1854, Sir Charles Wood, the President of the Board of Control of the British East India Company, sent a formal dispatch to Lord Dalhousie, the then Governor-General of India, suggesting a large shift to English language use within India. Sir Charles recommended that primary schools adopt vernacular languages, high schools adopt Anglo-vernacular language and that English be the medium of education in colleges. This communiqué is informally known as Wood's despatch. 

Wood's letter played an important role in the spread of English learning and female education in India. One of the most favorable steps taken was to create an English class among Indian people to be used as workforce in the company's administration. Vocational and women's education were also emphasized more heavily. 

This period of time in the British Raj was part of a final phase where the British governmental administration brought social reforms into India. After this period, the governing policies tended to become more reactionary, notably in the wake of major social and political unrest surrounding the Indian Rebellion of 1857

Background 
East India company's (EIC) largely ignored development of education in the India till mid of 19th century. Some use to think that we should transform India into civilised society, change their mindset by doing rapid changes, anathor motive was to educate them and recruit in Indian Civil Services (ICS). By learning English Indians will adopt British rule was on of the reasons that EIC wanted Indians should learn English. Lord Macaulay said "we (Britishers) should try to create a class of people, who will work like a translator between the people who we're ruling and us, even they'll look Indians by color but their dislikes-likes, mortals and thinking will be like an English".

Recommendations 

Wood recommendions was :
 English education will enhance the moral character of Indians and thus supply East India Company with civil servants who can be trusted.
 An education department was to be set up in every province.
 Universities on the model of the London university be established in big cities such as Bombay, Calcutta and Madras.
 At least one government school be opened in every district.
 Affiliated private schools should be given grant in aid.
 The Indian natives should be given training in their mother tongue also.
 Provision was made for a systematic method of education from primary level to the university level.
 The government should support education for women.
 The medium of instruction at the primary level was to be vernacular while at the higher levels it would be English.
 Promotion and stress on teachers’ training at all levels.

Measures taken 

After Wood's dispatch, several measures were taken by the East India Company:
 Setting up new institutions like the University of Calcutta, the University of Bombay and the University of Madras in 1857 as well as the University of the Punjab in 1882 and the University of Allahabad in 1887.
 In all provinces, education departments were set up.
 Promotion of English education, namely within academics and the bureaucracies of companies and public services.

Results 
English medium schools became popular in India.

References

 .

History of education in India